The Instituto de Economia da Universidade Estadual de Campinas is an academic unit of the State University of Campinas, located in the main campus of the University, in Barão Geraldo, Campinas, State of São Paulo, Brazil.

Originally created as a research institute within the Institute of Philosophy and Human Sciences (IFCH in Portuguese) of the State University of Campinas, it is today one of the most important public policy think-tanks in economics and related areas in Brazil. It is also a great supplier of policy makers in the country, such as: Celso Furtado, influential economist in the country, Aloízio Mercadante (Senator, SP), Luciano G.Coutinho (recently appointed as chairman of BNDES), José Serra (governor of São Paulo) and many others.

It offers one undergraduate major in Economics (BA Economics), many specialization courses (in Management, International Relations and Diplomacy, Labour Economics and Banking), and two Masters programs (Development Economics and Economic Theory) and one Ph.D. program.

Address
Cidade Universitária Zeferino Vaz
Instituto de Economia
Caixa Postal: 6135 - CEP 13083-970
Campinas - SP - Brasil

External links
 Instituto de Economia da Universidade Estadual de Campinas

Research institutes in Brazil
University of Campinas